Aphrocallistes is a genus of sponges belonging to the family Aphrocallistidae.

The species of this genus are found in Europe and Northern America.

Species:

Aphrocallistes beatrix 
Aphrocallistes bochotnicensis 
Aphrocallistes cylindrodactylus 
Aphrocallistes estevoui 
Aphrocallistes kazimierzensis 
Aphrocallistes lobatus 
Aphrocallistes macroporus 
Aphrocallistes mammillaris 
Aphrocallistes vastus 
Aphrocallistes verrucosus 
Aphrocallistes vistulae

References

Hexactinellida
Hexactinellida genera